Rides Again or Ride Again may refer to:

James Gang Rides Again, a 1970 album by the James Gang
Rides Again (David Allen Coe album), 1977
Rides Again, a 1987 album by Lazy Lester
Rides Again (band), a Canadian rock band
 Ride Again (EP), 2019 release by the Shakespears Sister
 Ride Again (album), 1988 release by the Purple Helmets

See also